Linh Nga (born 3 January 1982), is an American-Vietnamese film director, film producer, actress, and screenwriter. Linh Nga's 2019 documentary "Inside this peace" won "Award Of Merit" at the Impact DOCS Awards, won "Best Feature Documentary" at the California Women's Film Festival, and nominated for "Best Feature Documentary" at the Action On Film International Film Festival. Her 2003 film Up and Down the Dust Way (Xuoi nguoc duong tran) won "TV Best Series" at the Vietnamese International Film Festival. She is the founder of 9669 films.

Biography and career
Linh Nga was born in Hanoi, Vietnam, on January 3, 1982, to Quang Duy Nguyen, a composer, and Thuy Bich Thi Le, an opera singer.

Nga began her career on stage at an early age. She often sang and performed at friends' and family's functions and was part of a local song and dance troupe. In 1990, she earned her first award for "Nam Dinh City's Best Young Voice". Two years later, she joined the Club of Love (Cau lac bo tinh thuong), a registered charity group formed by Tuong Vi. She began her professional dancing career at the age of ten. In 1992, she began attending the Vietnam Academy of Dance (Truong Cao Dang mua Viet Nam), where she achieved artistic and academic honors upon graduation.

In 2000, Nga began studying film directing at the Hanoi Academy of Theatre and Cinema. She wrote, directed, and starred in the television series, Xuoi nguoc duong tran, in 2002. This earned a National Television Award at the Vietnamese International Film Festival for Best Television Series of the year. In 2006, Linh Nga graduated. During this time, she also worked for a Vietnam Television as an actress. Upon graduation, Nga went abroad and successfully applied to Chapman University in California, pursuing her Master of Fine Arts in film production and sound design.

In May 2014, Nga graduated from Chapman University. That same year, she founded 9669 Films. In November 2017, 9669 Films released the action comedy short What's the good of being good? (2017 film).

Documentary about Agent Orange
In January 2019, Linh Nga and 9669 films won "Best Feature Documentary" at the California Women's Film Festival 2019 and earned "Award Of Merit" at the Impact DOCS Awards for the film "Inside this peace", a documentary about an Agent Orange victim struggling with life in Vietnam. "Inside this peace" is also nominated for "Best feature documentary" at the Action On Film International Film Festival

Business ventures in Vietnam
In 2003, Nga helped found the Linh Nga Communication and Trading Company Lmt with her brother Linh Duy. The film company closed in 2010. Linh Nga also founded restaurants in Hanoi.

Personal life
Nga reportedly had a romantic relationship with Thuyet Tran, known as Thuyet Buon Vua in Năm Cam case. The pair married in 2002. A week after, Thuyet was arrested and sentenced to 20 years in prison related to Năm Cam. In 2007 she married Johnny K.P.; they were divorced in 2011. She has two daughters.

Filmography

Honours & Awards

References

External links

1982 births
Living people
People from Hanoi
Film directors from California
Film producers from California
Businesspeople from California
Vietnamese women film directors
Vietnamese documentary film directors
American women film directors
American women documentary filmmakers
American women film producers
Action film directors
Vietnamese television actresses
Chapman University alumni
American people of Vietnamese descent
20th-century American actresses
21st-century American actresses
21st-century American businesswomen
21st-century American businesspeople